The 2012 Hangzhou Greentown F.C. season is Hangzhou's 6th consecutive season in the Chinese Super League. Hangzhou will also be competing in the Chinese FA Cup.

Players

First team

Reserve squad

On loan

Coaching staff

Competitions

Chinese Super League

League table

Matches

Chinese FA Cup

References

2012
Hangzhou Greentown